Frank Ivor Hansen (4 February 1884 – 5 May 1975) was an Australian Rules footballer who played for  and  in the South Australian Football League.

Early life 
He was the son of James Hansen and Briget Neesen, Norwegian and Scottish immigrants.

South Adelaide 
Frank Hansen debuted for South Adelaide in the 1903 SAFL season. He would lead the club in goal kicking in 1907 with 24 goals, 1908 with 28 and 1909 with 20.

Port Adelaide 

He led the competitions goal tally for four consecutive seasons between 1910 and 1913. He would play only one game in 1914 retiring at the age of 29.

Coaching 
Frank Hansen was coach of Port Adelaide from 1919–1923 in varying capacities.

Personal life 
Frank Hansen married during 1914 and died during 1975 at the age of 91.

References

1884 births
1975 deaths
South Adelaide Football Club players
Port Adelaide Football Club (SANFL) players
Port Adelaide Football Club players (all competitions)
Australian rules footballers from South Australia
Port Adelaide Football Club (SANFL) coaches